Graupel, also called soft hail, hominy snow, or snow pellets, is precipitation that forms when supercooled water droplets in air are collected and freeze on falling snowflakes, forming  balls of crisp, opaque rime.

Graupel is distinct from hail and ice pellets in both formation and appearance. However, both hail and graupel are common in thunderstorms with cumulonimbus clouds, though graupel also falls in winter storms, and at higher elevations as well.  The METAR code for graupel is GS.

Formation

Under some atmospheric conditions, snow crystals may encounter supercooled water droplets. Contact between a snow crystal and the supercooled droplets results in freezing of the liquid droplets onto the surface of the crystal. This process of crystal growth is known as accretion. Crystals that exhibit frozen droplets on their surfaces are often referred to as rimed. When this process continues so that the shape of the original snow crystal is no longer identifiable and has become ball-like, the resulting crystal is referred to as graupel.

Graupel was formerly referred to by meteorologists as "soft hail." However, graupel is easily distinguishable from hail in both the shape and strength of the pellet and, in some cases, the circumstances in which it falls. Ice from hail is formed in hard, relatively uniform layers and usually falls only during thunderstorms. Graupel forms fragile, soft, oblong crystals and falls in place of typical snowflakes in wintry mix situations, often in concert with ice pellets. However, graupel does also occur in thunderstorms. Graupel is also fragile enough that it will typically fall apart when pressed on.

Microscopic structure
The frozen droplets on the surface of rimed crystals are difficult to see even when zoomed in, and the topography of a graupel particle is not easy to record with a light microscope because of the limited resolution and depth of field in the instrument.

The rime has been observed on all four basic forms of snow crystals, including plates, dendrites, columns and needles. As the riming process continues, the mass of frozen, accumulated cloud droplets eventually obscures the form of the original snow crystal, thereby giving rise to graupel.

Graupel and avalanches
Graupel commonly forms in high-altitude climates and is both denser and more granular than ordinary snow, due to its rimed exterior. Macroscopically, graupel resembles small beads of polystyrene. In addition, thinner layers of graupel falling at low temperatures can act as ball bearings below subsequent falls of more naturally stable snow, rendering them also liable to avalanche or otherwise making surfaces slippery. Graupel tends to compact and stabilise ("weld") approximately one or two days after falling, depending on the temperature and the properties of the graupel.

Gallery

See also
 Sleet - term variously used for frozen precipitation
 Freezing rain
 Ice pellets

References

External links

Dictionaries
 3 results for:graupel. Dictionary.com, accessed September 12, 2006.
 Graupel. Merriam-Webster Online Dictionary, accessed September 12, 2006.

Weather glossaries
 Weather Glossary, G. The Weather Channel, accessed September 12, 2006.
 All About Snow. National Snow and Ice Data Center (NSIDC), accessed September 12, 2006.
 Terms used by meteorologists, forecasters, weather observers, and in weather forecasts. National Oceanic and Atmospheric Administration (NOAA), accessed September 12, 2006.
 About.com Weather Glossary. Weather at About.com, accessed December 21, 2008.

Snow or ice weather phenomena
Precipitation
Hail